El Impulso is the oldest newspaper in Venezuelan founded in 1904, it's a regional newspaper, headquartered in Barquisimeto, in the state of Lara.  El Impulso is a family owned business, and its currently managed by the fourth and fifth generation.

History

Founding
Founded in Carora in 1904, El Impulso moved to Barquisimeto in 1919. Founded by Federico Carmona in 1904, it was passed on to his son in 1928, and was controlled by the Carmona family.

Bolivarian government
The paper ceased publication on 15 September 2014 due to the lack of printing paper and financial problems, though it later was able to produce once again. Almost four years later, the newspaper released a statement explaining that the circulation of physical copies was to cease "indefinitely" due to the mismanagement and alleged censorship practices of the Nicolás Maduro government.

See also
 List of newspapers in Venezuela

References

External links
El Impulso website

2014 disestablishments in Venezuela
Publications established in 1904
Publications disestablished in 2014
Spanish-language newspapers
Newspapers published in Venezuela
Defunct newspapers published in Venezuela
Mass media in Barquisimeto